Whoever Comes Knocking is the third studio album by Ghanaian-Canadian Singer-songwriter Kae Sun. It was released on March 2, 2018, by Moonshine. He revealed the album's track listing in December 2017.

Track listing
 Kwaku's Dilemma (Intro)
 Treehouse
 Stalk
 Canary
 Longwalk
 Fix Up (ft. Ariane Moffatt)
 Flip The Rules
 Breaking
 Broken By Design
 The Moment

References

Kae Sun albums
2018 albums